Michael Stephen Matheson (born 8 September 1970) is a Scottish politician serving as Cabinet Secretary for Net Zero, Energy and Transport  since 2018. He previously served as Cabinet Secretary for Justice from 2014 to 2018 and Minister for Public Health from 2011 to 2014. 

A member of the Scottish National Party (SNP), he has been a Member of the Scottish Parliament (MSP) since 1999, first representing the Central Scotland region and, since 2007, the Falkirk West constituency.

A graduate of the Queen Margaret University and Open University, Matheson worked as an occupational therapist in local government, before his election to Holyrood in the 1999 Scottish Parliament election. He served successively as the SNP's shadow deputy minister for justice and rural development and shadow minister for culture and sport. Matheson ran unsuccessfully, twice, for the Falkirk West constituency, however, remained as an additional member for the Central Scotland region until the 2007 election, when he was third time lucky. He sat on the SNP's backbenches from 2007 until 2011, when he was appointed Minister for Public Health in First Minister Alex Salmond's second government, supporting Nicola Sturgeon, and later Alex Neil, in their role as Health Secretary. 

Following the appointment of Sturgeon as First Minister, she appointed Matheson to the Scottish Cabinet as the Justice Secretary. In a 2018 Scottish Cabinet reshuffle, he was appointed to the new post of Cabinet Secretary of Transport, Infrastructure and Connectivity. The office was retitled as the Cabinet Secretary for Net Zero, Energy and Transport in Sturgeon's third administration, as part of her government's effort to tackle the climate emergency.

Early life

Birth and education 
Michael Stephen Matheson was born on 8 September 1970 in Glasgow. He was raised in the Toryglen district and educated at John Bosco Secondary School in the city. He then attended Queen Margaret University where he graduated with a Bachelor of Science degree in occupational therapy in 1991. He later went on to graduate from the Open University with both a Bachelor of Arts degree and a Postgraduate diploma in applied social sciences. Following graduation, he worked as a community occupational therapist for eight years, until his election to the Scottish Parliament.

Early political career 
Matheson worked for Highland Regional Council, Central Regional Council and Stirling Council. He first stood as a parliamentary candidate for the SNP in the 1997 general election, standing for the newly created Hamilton North and Bellshill constituency.

Political career

Election to Holyrood 
In the 1999 Scottish parliamentary election, Matheson contested the Falkirk West constituency, which was won by the independent Dennis Canavan, who had been rejected by the Labour Party. However, Matheson was ranked third on the SNP's regional list for Central Scotland and was one of the five SNP candidates elected in the region.

SNP in opposition: 1999–2007 
He served as Shadow Deputy Minister for Justice from May 1999 until September 2004, and as Shadow Deputy Minister for Rural Development from October 2001 until September 2004. Matheson also served on the Equal Opportunities Committee, the Justice and Home Affairs Committee, and the Justice 1 Committee between 1999 and 2004. During the 2000 SNP deputy leadership election, he was the campaign manager for Roseanna Cunningham.

He contested the Falkirk West constituency again at the 2003 Scottish parliamentary election, and although it was won again by Denis Canavan, Matheson was re-elected as one of three SNP MSPs for Central Scotland. In the parliament's second session he served on the Justice 1 Committee, the Enterprise and Culture Committee and the Justice 2 Committee. From September 2004 until September 2006, he was Shadow Minister for Culture and Sport.

Backbencher: 2007–2011 
Matheson won the constituency in the 2007 election with a majority of 776 votes over Labour, after Canavan stepped down. (Canavan later endorsed Matheson for re-election in 2011).
Matheson was a member of the Health and Sport Committee from June 2007 until March 2011 and was the Deputy Convener of the European and External Relations Committee from March 2009 until July 2010. He was also a member of the End of Life Assistance (Scotland) Bill Committee.

Before becoming a Minister, Matheson was actively involved in a number of Parliamentary Cross-Party Groups, including those on Malawi, Sport, Alzheimer's disease, International development, Russia and Taiwan.

At the 2011 Scottish parliamentary election, he retained his seat with an increased majority of 5,745 votes over Labour.

Salmond admistartion: 2011–2014 
He was appointed as Minister for Public Health after the SNP landslide in 2011, a position he held until the November 2014 reshuffle which saw him promoted to cabinet rank as Cabinet Secretary for Justice.

Justice Secretary: 2014–2018 
Following the appointment of Nicola Sturgeon as First Minister of Scotland, she appointed Matheson as the Cabinet Secretary for Justice on 21 November 2014. In Sturgeon's 2016 cabinet reshuffle, he remained in the post of Justice Secretary. Matheson was supported by the Minister for Community Safety, Paul Wheelhouse, and later, Annabelle Ewing.

Crime and policing 
Matheson supported efforts to merge British Transport Police with Police Scotland. He also proposed for the criminal justice system in Scotland to move from prison towards rehabilitation in a bid to reduce re-offending rates.

Criminal misconduct within police authorities 
The justice system in Scotland was claimed to have been in a "state of chaos" amid criminal misconduct of high ranking officials in Police Scotland and the Scottish Police Authority. The scandal erupted following the absence leave of chief constable of Police Scotland Phil Gormley, who was accused of bullying. He resigned and was succeeded by his deputy Iain Livingston. The chief executive and chair of governing body the Scottish Police Authority (SPA) also resigned. In 2018, a BBC Scotland investigation raised concerns that "bad practices and unlawful behaviour in the previous eight regional forces had continued" after Police Scotland was established in 2013. 

Matheson was accused of being "invisible" and "closing down questions" amid allegations of gross misconduct and leader of the Scottish Conservatives, Ruth Davidson, raised the possibility he may have acted unlawful. Scottish Labour also claimed Matheson was unlawful after ignoring recommendations by the SPA not to allow Gormley to return from his suspension.

Transport Secretary: 2018–present 
In a cabinet reshuffle in 2018, he was shifted to Cabinet Secretary for Transport, Infrastructure and Connectivity. In 2021, his portfolio changed, with infrastructure and connectivity being replaced with net zero and energy, becoming Cabinet Secretary for Net Zero, Energy and Transport.

He endorsed Humza Yousaf in the 2023 Scottish National Party leadership election.

Personal life 
Matheson has been married to Susan Totten since 2005. They have three sons; Sean, James and Daniel.

Notes

References

External links
 
Michael Matheson MSP official constituency website
Scottish National Party – Falkirk District

1970 births
Living people
Alumni of Queen Margaret University
Members of the Scottish Cabinet
Scottish National Party MSPs
Members of the Scottish Parliament 1999–2003
Members of the Scottish Parliament 2003–2007
Members of the Scottish Parliament 2007–2011
Members of the Scottish Parliament 2011–2016
Members of the Scottish Parliament 2016–2021
Members of the Scottish Parliament 2021–2026
Justice ministers of Scotland
Politicians from Glasgow
People associated with Falkirk (council area)